Charles Émile Egli (known as Carlègle; 30 March 1877 – 11 January 1937) was a Swiss-born illustrator and painter who spent most of his life in Paris.

Early years

Charles Émile Egli was born in Aigle, Switzerland on 30 March 1877.
He was educated in Aigle and then at the college of Vevey.
When he was eighteen he attended engraving classes of Alfred Martin at the school of industrial arts in Geneva.
Four year later he moved to Paris, where he stayed the rest of his life.
Egli studied at the École des Beaux-Arts.

Career

Egli adopted the pseudonym of Carlègle. He soon became known in satirical journals like Le Rire, Le Sourire, La Vie Parisienne, L'Assiette au Beurre, Fantasio, La Gazette do Bon Ton, Les Humoristes and Qui lit rit. Egli excelled in wood engraving.
His illustrations for Daphnis et Chloé exhibited in the autumn Salon of 1913 launched his career. From then until his death in 1937 he illustrated books by classical and contemporary authors such as Virgil, Paul Valéry, Blaise Pascal, Paul Verlaine, Anatole France and Charles Maurras.
He was naturalized in 1927.

Charles Émile Egli died in Paris on 11 January 1937.
He was the subject of a book by Hugues Delorme published in 1939.

Selected works 
Books that Egli illustrated include:
 Carnet d'un Combattant by Paul Tuffrau, Payot - appeared in 1917, under the pseudonym of lieutenant E.R., with 64 pen drawings
 Frontispice in the review L'Encrier, founded by Roger Dévigne in May 1919
 La Petite Fille aux Papillotes, original wood engraving in the review L'Encrier (15 October-15 November 1919)
 Daphnis et Chloé by Longus, chez Pichon in 1919
 Le Train de 8h47 by Georges Courteline, Paris, Société littéraires de France
 Les Linottes by Georges Courteline, Paris, Éditions littéraires de France
 Les Aventures du Roi Pausole by Pierre Louys, first published by Fayard (« Modern Bibliothèque ») in 1908, then with different illustrations by Briffaut in 1924
 Mon Amie Nane by Paul-Jean Toulet, 18 original wood engravings, Paris, Léon Pichon, 1925
 Les Contrerimes by Paul-Jean Toulet, 6 original wood engravings, Brussels, Editions Un Coup de Dés, 1927
 Lysistrata d'Aristophane, Paris, Éditions Briffaut, 1928
 Maxime de Duvernois, Babou, 1929
 Le Sopha de Crébillon, Mornay, 1933
 Nudité de Colette, La Mappemonde, 1943 (posthumous)
 L'Arlequin aux Jacinthes by Maurice Venoize, Boivin et Cie, undated

Engravings from Les Linottes

References
Citations

Sources

 

1877 births
1937 deaths
20th-century French painters
20th-century French male artists
French male painters
Swiss emigrants to France